Vitalia Diatchenko was the defending champion but chose not to participate.

Linda Nosková won the title, defeating Léolia Jeanjean in the final, 6–3, 6–4.

Seeds

Draw

Finals

Top half

Bottom half

References

Main Draw

Engie Open de Seine-et-Marne - Singles